The 1984 Chatham Cup was the 57th annual nationwide knockout football competition in New Zealand.

Early stages of the competition were run in three regions (northern, central, and southern), with the National League teams receiving a bye until the fourth round (last 32) of the competition. In all, 128 teams took part in the competition. Note: Different sources give different numberings for the rounds of the competition: some start round one with the beginning of the regional qualifications; others start numbering from the first national knock-out stage. The former numbering scheme is used in this article.

The 1984 final
The final was shifted by one month from its normal date in early September, being played in October for the first time. Gisborne was expected to win the trophy, being on paper as the stronger side, with internationals Grant Turner, Kenny Cresswell and Colin Walker all in their line-up. 

In the final, however, it was Manurewa who proved the sturdier side. Largely through the efforts of keeper Rudi Feitsma the soaked up the Gisborne pressure, while swift breaks saw Manurewa score twice with a brace from Steve Sumner in the 11th and 28th minutes. A strike from Cresswell in the 80th minute gave the East Coast side some hope of a comeback, but it was too late to save the day.

Results

Third round

* Won on penalties by New Brighton (5-3)

Fourth round

Fifth round

Quarter-finals

* Manurewa won 4-3 on penalties

Semi-finals

Replay

Final

References

Rec.Sport.Soccer Statistics Foundation New Zealand 1984 page
UltimateNZSoccer website 1984 Chatham Cup page

Chatham Cup
Chatham Cup
Chatham Cup
Chat